Anton Joksch (13 April 1900 – 27 January 1962) was a German cyclist. He competed in the team pursuit event at the 1928 Summer Olympics.

References

External links
 

1900 births
1962 deaths
German male cyclists
Olympic cyclists of Germany
Cyclists at the 1928 Summer Olympics
Cyclists from Dortmund
20th-century German people